Relentless is a 2009 suspense thriller from The New York Times #1 best selling author, Dean Koontz.  The story follows the plight of best selling author Cullen "Cubby" Greenwich, his wife, son, and family dog, Lassie, who are being stalked and hunted by a feared and revered national book critic, Shearman Waxx.  The novel was released in the US on June 9, 2009 by Bantam Books.

Plot summary

Cullen "Cubby" Greenwich has just released his sixth novel, One O'Clock Jump which is generally well received in the literary community.  However, Shearman Waxx, considered to be a preeminent literary critic, writes a scathing, albeit somewhat inaccurate review of Cubby's latest work.

Against the advice of his wife, Penny Greenwich, a children's book author in her own right, Cubby attempts to gather some information about his new nemesis. Cubby learns that he and the critic share a favorite dining locale.  Accompanying Cubby to the restaurant is his six-year-old prodigy son, Milo.  A chance encounter in the men's room foretells the ensuing chaos when Shearman Waxx simply utters "Doom."

Upon arriving home, the residents of the house go about their daily business, when Shearman Waxx is seen walking the interior of the house. With Cubby yelling at him the whole time, he finally leaves. That night, they turn on security and alarms but are awakened in the night by Sherman Waxx in their room again repeating the words "Doom". Penny and Cubby are both tasered multiple times by the eccentric book critic. The electricity, which has previously been shut down, turns back on once Waxx leaves and the alarm system states that it is fully functional and undisturbed.

Receiving a call from a fellow writer who had previously endured a similar slandering at the hands of Waxx, Cubby is told of the horrific manner in which the writer's family was murdered.  The writer encourages Greenwich to abandon his home and flee.

The family flees their Greenwich home to the presumed safety of a friend's real estate investment project. After a sudden round of rifle shots into the living room, it is apparent that their son, Milo, is being solely targeted. When their moves are quickly countered by the escalating violence of their pursuers it becomes apparent they need to seek armament and information.

The family seeks refuge with Penny Greenwich's apocalypse-fearing family who, having been warned ahead of time, are in their well-fortified bunker.  Not content being forced into the role of reclusive prey, the family embarks on a journey to determine who they're dealing with and what can be done to stop him.

Their journey takes them to the hometown of two former artists in an attempt to digest the brutality with which they and their families were dispatched.  Along the way, the family counters the rising tension and ever-present shadow of death with bits of sarcastic humor and Milo, by engrossing himself in his increasingly complex scientific projects.

The story follows the Greenwiches as they search for clues into the past of their tormentor and seek to discover his motives. They work with a former sheriff named Truman who is also investigating Waxx. Two associates of Waxx arrive at the scene murdering Truman but are then killed by Cubby and his wife. While retreating they kidnap Waxx himself. They take him to his own house, and encounter his mother, Zazu, who reveals herself as the mastermind of an organization that seeks to control society by destroying those who create positive symbols of hope and happiness through their artwork.

Zazu orders her grandson, one of the pursuers, to make sure that Waxx is in the car.  He stabs Waxx, killing him, and Zazu is enraged.  She pulls out her gun which was hidden and kills her grandson, and then shoots Cubby. Cubby falls to the floor and dies.  Previous examples of Milo's scientific endeavors activate. Time goes backwards and Cubby is saved, but Zazu dies.

The novel ends with the family traveling back to the bunker, seeing it as an oasis of protection from Zazu's organization and the world they intend to create.

References

External links
Koontz Website for the novel

Novels by Dean Koontz
2009 American novels
American thriller novels
Novels about writers